The Independent (formerly The Evening Independent) is an American daily newspaper published weekdays and Saturdays in Massillon, Ohio. It is owned by GateHouse Media.

The newspaper covers western Stark County, Ohio, including Massillon, 
Beach City, Brewster, Canal Fulton, Jackson, Lawrence Township, Navarre, Perry and Tuscarawas Township.
 
GateHouse acquired the paper from Copley Newspapers in April 2007. 

The Independent is related to three other Northeast Ohio newspapers, the dailies The Repository of Canton and The Times-Reporter of New Philadelphia, and the weekly The Suburbanite in southern Summit County.

References

External links
The Independent website
The Repository website
Times-Reporter website
The Suburbanite website

Newspapers published in Ohio
Publications established in 1863
Massillon, Ohio
1863 establishments in Ohio
Gannett publications